Christchurch School is a private college-preparatory coed boarding school in Christchurch, Virginia, founded in 1921 by the Episcopal Church Diocese of Virginia. Near the colonial port town of Urbanna, Virginia and located on a 125-acre waterfront campus on the Rappahannock River near the Chesapeake Bay, the school enrolls approximately 225 students, boarding and day, grades 9-12. Day students number approximately 45% of the student body, and are generally evenly divided among boys and girls. The majority of domestic boarding students come from Virginia, D.C., Maryland, and North Carolina. However, in recent years students have come other states including Florida, Georgia, Tennessee, South Carolina, Texas, Rhode Island, New York, New Jersey, Connecticut, and Illinois. Christchurch also attracts international students from countries including China, the Bahamas, Vietnam, Korea, Germany, Turkey, Ghana, Guatemala, and Mexico.

Academics 
Christchurch offers a college prep program.  In addition, a Learning Skills program offers appropriate support so that all students can succeed academically. Over seventy-five percent of the faculty lives on campus. Faculty serve as coaches, advisors, and dorm parents.

Admission to Christchurch School is based upon the candidate's application, recommendations, questionnaires, transcripts, and a personal interview.

Christchurch is a member of the National Association of Independent Schools, the National Association of Episcopal Schools, and the Virginia Association of Independent Sch

Great Journeys Begin at the River 
The 125-acre campus on the banks of the Rappahannock River and in the Chesapeake Bay Watershed, offers opportunity for a hands-on curriculum "Great Journeys Begin at the River" with students making discoveries and connections both inside and outside the classroom.  The river is two miles wide at the Christchurch campus.

The Rappahannock River and the Chesapeake Bay watershed offer a living classroom for marine science and an out-of-door co-curricular experience, with opportunities for sailing, crew, research projects, class trips, adventuring, team-building, and leadership.

Athletics

Lacrosse
2010 State Champions

Football
Christchurch's Varsity Football Team won the Division II state championship in 2011 and 2017.

Basketball
Christchurch School's Varsity Men's Basketball Team won the Prep League Championship in 1994 and the VISAA Division II state championship in 2013.

Sailing
The school has its own sailing fleet, onsite boathouse, and sailing venue. It competes in the Virginia Interscholastic Sailing Association (VISA) league of the Mid-Atlantic Scholastic Sailing Association district, one of seven districts in the Interscholastic Sailing Association. The team is nationally ranked, and won the Atlantic Coast Championship in both 2016 and 2017, and won the ISSA Team Racing National Championship in May 2019.

Notable alumni
William Styron, Pulitzer Prize-winning author
Vincent Canby, '41 film critic for The New York Times
Lewis Burwell Puller Jr., First Lieutenant in the United States Marine Corps, Pulitzer Prize–winning author of "Fortunate Son",  Vietnam War hero, attorney,  earned the Silver Star, two Purple Hearts, the Navy Commendation Medal and the Vietnam Cross of Gallantry
Bill Brill '48 - ACC Sportswriting Hall of Fame
John Craine, Jr. '64 - President, SUNY Maritime College, Vice Admiral (USN Ret)
Charles Barlowe '79 - National Institute of Health MERIT Award, Chair and Professor of Biochemistry, Dartmouth Medical College Department of Biochemistry
Andrew Rice '92 - former Oklahoma State Senator (D), US Senate candidate
Devin Robinson '14 - former starter for the Florida Gators, played for the Washington Wizards of the NBA, and currently plays for the Toronto Raptors. Helped lead Christchurch to a basketball state championship in 2013.

Notes

External links
School website

Boarding schools in Virginia
Educational institutions established in 1921
Private high schools in Virginia
Schools in Middlesex County, Virginia
1921 establishments in Virginia
Episcopal schools in the United States